The Topklasse (known until 2010 as the Hoofdklasse) is the highest domestic 50-over cricket competition in the Netherlands.

Until 2016 the league featured 8 teams playing in a double round-robin format, followed by relegation and championship play-offs. From 2017 the league reverted to a simple ten-team double round-robin format.

The dominant club in terms of league titles has been HCC (Hague Cricket Club). Based in The Hague the club was formed in 1878 and won the first Dutch title in 1884. As of 2018, the club has won 48 Topklasse titles, most recently in 2008. The club was so dominant in Dutch cricket in the years after World War I that its Second XI was allowed to play in the top division and won the title five times between 1928 and 1935 - as well as sharing the title with the HCC First XI in 1926.

The current champions as of the 2022 edition are HCC Den Haag.

Previous champions

Championship titles

References

External links
  Official Website
  Current Season

Cricket in the Netherlands
Dutch domestic cricket competitions